Breaking Sensation is the second extended play from South Korean boy band SF9. It was released on April 18, 2017, by FNC Entertainment. The album consists of six tracks, including the title track, "Easy Love".

Commercial performance
The EP sold 27,360+ copies in South Korea. It peaked at number 5 on the Korean Gaon Chart.

Track listing

References

2017 EPs
SF9 (band) EPs
FNC Entertainment EPs
Kakao M EPs